Nymboida Power Station is a hydroelectric power station located at Nymboida, New South Wales, Australia.

The power station was built by Clarence River County Council between 1924 and 1926. The power station is listed as operational List of active power stations in New South Wales however output is dependent on river flows.

The power station takes water from the Nymboida River and returns it to Goolang Creek. The increased unnatural flow created from the station flow has created significant damage to the creek, lowering the level of the creek over the 80+ years of operation. The flow, however, has created an additional feature as the water flow is used as a canoeing venue.

Notes

Energy infrastructure completed in 1926
Hydroelectric power stations in New South Wales